Karl Szoldatics (23 October 1906 – 12 February 1950) was an Austrian footballer. He played in four matches for the Austria national football team from 1927 to 1931.

References

External links
 

1906 births
1950 deaths
Austrian footballers
Austria international footballers
Place of birth missing
Association footballers not categorized by position
1. Simmeringer SC players